The ACT Civil and Administrative Tribunal (ACAT) is a tribunal in the Australian Capital Territory.

It provides a forum for the determination of a wide range of civil disputes, requests for review of administrative decisions, and professional and occupational disciplinary matters.

History 
The ACT Civil and Administrative Tribunal was established via the ACT Civil and Administrative Tribunal Act 2008, which took effect on 2 February 2009. 

The tribunal took over the work of several existing tribunals and boards, including the Administrative Appeals Tribunal, Small Claims Court, Discrimination Tribunal, Guardianship and Management of Property Tribunal, Mental Health Tribunal, Residential Tenancies Tribunal, Liquor Licensing Board, Health Professions Tribunal, Legal Practitioners Disciplinary Tribunal, and ACT Court of Appeal Case Records. The records of these former tribunals and boards are held by the ACT Civil and Administrative Tribunal.

References

External links
 ACT Civil and Administrative Tribunal Act 2008 at Australasian Legal Information Institute

Australian Capital Territory courts and tribunals
Australian tribunals
2009 establishments in Australia
Courts and tribunals established in 2009